The South African Medical Service (SAMS) was a branch of the South African Defence Force (SADF). In 1994 when the SADF was merged with various other military and armed resistance forces as part of the post-apartheid reforms the SAMS became the South African Military Health Service of the South African National Defence Force. The SAMS operated three hospitals, 1 Military Hospital in Pretoria, 2 Military Hospital in Cape Town, and 3 Military Hospital in Bloemfontein. It also had three specialist institutes; the Institute for Aviation Medicine, the Institute for Maritime Medicine, and the Military Psychological Institute.

History

The SA Defence Act Amendment Act, No. 22 of 1922 re-organised the Permanent Force. From 1 February 1923 the Permanent Force consisted a number of Corps, including the SA Medical Corps.

By that time three Medical Corps were already in existence, the Transvaal Medical Corps (established in 1903), the Natal Volunteer Medical Corps (established in 1899) and the Cape Medical Staff Corps.

Over the years, the following Corps formed part of the South African Army:
SA Veterinary Corps (1913–46) - incorporated into SA Medical Corps (SAMC)
SA Medical Corps (1913–70) - incorporated into South African Medical Service
SA Military Nursing Service (1914–70) 
SA Military Nursing Corps (1970–72) - incorporated into SAMS

Organisation of Medical Corps in 1970s 

In the late 1970's before the establishment of the South African Medical Service as an independent Arm of Service, the SA Army's Medical Corps' mobile elements were organised as follows:

Assigned to 1 SA Corps:
 23 Mobile Hospital,
 48 Field Ambulance Unit, and
 26 Field Hygiene Company.

Assigned to 7 South African Infantry Division:
 17 Mobile Hospital, and
 17 Field Ambulance Unit,
as divisional troops,
while each brigade
had assigned a field ambulance unit (numbered 71, 72 and 73 respectively).

Assigned to 8th Armoured Division (South Africa):
 18 Mobile Hospital and
 18 Field Ambulance Unit, 
as divisional troops, while each brigade had assigned a 
field ambulance unit (numbered
81, 82, 83 and 84 respectively).

The SAMS was established in July 1979 as a service branch of the SADF. The establishment combined the medical services of the Army, Navy and the Air Force. The head of the SAMS was the Surgeon-General who had the rank of Lieutenant-General. The role of the SAMS was to provide health and medical support services to the SADF, it included a veterinary section that looked after dogs and horses.

Leadership

Ranks
Officers

References

 

Military of South Africa
Military medical organizations